In Deep  may refer to:

Music
In Deep (Argent album), 1973
In Deep (Mark Lockheart album), 2009
In Deep (Tina Arena album), 1997
In Deep, an album by Marion Meadows, 2002
Indeep, a 1980s American dance music group

Other uses
In Deep (book), a 1963 short-story collection by Damon Knight
In Deep (TV series), a 2000s British crime drama series
In Deep with Angie Coiro, an American radio talk program hosted by Angie Coiro

See also
In the Deep (disambiguation)
In Too Deep (disambiguation)